Marnaves is a commune in the Tarn department and Occitanie region of southern France.

Geography
The commune is traversed by the Cérou river.

See also
Communes of the Tarn department

References

Communes of Tarn (department)